Juvenia Kraków is a Polish rugby union club based in Kraków, Poland. They were founded in 1906 (like Wisła Kraków and Cracovia) as a football club. The rugby union team was founded in 1973 and currently play in the Rugby Extraleague.

History of the rugby section
The rugby section was founded in 1973. The first rugby match was played the following year against Posnania, who had been relegated from the Rugby Extraleague; Juvenia lost 60–0. For the next three years Juvenia had not won a single match. They had their first win in 1976 and in the same year they achieved a semi-final place in the Polish Cup where they lost to Czarni Bytom 12–15.

Juvenia came close to promotion to the top tier on two occasions. The first was in 1982, when they drew with Budowlani Olsztyn (7–7), who were promoted. The second chance occurred two years later, in 1984, when they also missed out on promotion. 

In 1986 the rugby section was moved to Korona Kraków, which caused the suspension of the section, only to return in 1993. In 2000 the team was promoted to the Rugby Ekstraliga, where they played for three seasons. In 2003 the club was relegated to the I liga Rugby but returned to the Rugby Extraleague in 2005. In 2006 Salwator became its main sponsor and the first team changed its name to Salwator Juvenia Kraków. They ended that season on the highest, third place. Since 2009, Salwator is no longer the team sponsor and the name has changed back to Juvenia Kraków. 
In 2012 Juvennia were relegated but won promotion to the top flight league in 2014 but financial problems forced the club back to division 1 but within a year and new sponsors and management Juvenia won promotion again to the Ekstraliga. In the 2015-16 season Juvenia were successful in a series of relegation play-off games and retained the Ekstraliga status and repeated the same success in the 2016-17 season and the following rugby season. In 2018-19 Juvenia maintained their place in the Ekstraliga without having to face the relegation play-off matches. The 2019-20 season saw Juvenia in 4th place and a finalist in the Polish Cup competition. The club’s grassroots project also yielded positive results with the U.18s reaching the final of the prestigious Dubai 7s Tournament and winning the Polish league and cup competitions outright in the same season.

The board
 President – Leszek Samel
 Vice president – Maciej Mączka

First team squad

References

Sources
 Juvenia Kraków website
 Logo of Juvenia
 Juvenia at Cracow Life

Polish rugby union teams
Rugby clubs established in 1973
Sport in Kraków